Season 1 of the reality competition series Mongolia's Got Talent premiered in June 2015 and was broadcast in September 2015.

 Rokit Bay (Mongolian Rapper)
 Chimeglkham Delgertsetseg (a professional violist)
 Sarantsetseg Chimgee (a news commentator from Mongol TV)
 Tserendorj Chuluunbat (bass guitarist from Haranga rock band) was the 4 judges of the competition.

First round
On the first round about 2100 contestants entered and 104 contestants were advanced to the second round. The first round began in July 2015 and was broadcast on September and finished in October 2015.

Second round
The 104 winners of the judges round was picked by the judges without a contest and 32 contestants was entered the Semi Finals. But a group named Tsohiur Hogjmiin Chuulga was eliminated by own discussion so judges picked Erdene Nandinzaya who was eliminated at the second round.

Semi-finals

The 32 contestants that qualified from round 2 will face each other in groups. The semi-final contains 4 groups and each group contains 8 contestants. The contestants with the most votes automatically advance for the final round and with the second and third most voted contestants will picked by the judges. The winner of the judges choice will qualify for the final round. If the judges choice draws the most voted one will be advanced.

Group 1

Group 2

Group 3

Group 4

Finale
The Winners and the Runners-Up of the Semi Finals was faced each other in a single group. The Winner was Egshiglent Chimee and was awarded 100 Million ₮ about 50 Thousand $.

Final group

Mongolia's Got Talent